Termitopaediini is a tribe in the rove beetle subfamily Aleocharinae. Much of it was classified and documented by Kistner in 1977.

Below are a list of some of the genera this tribe contains:

 Coatonipulex Kistner, 1977 
 Dioxeuta 
 Macrotermophila 
 Macrotoxenus 
 Paratermitopulex Kistner, 1977
 Physomilitaris Kistner, 1977
 Polyteinia 
 Protermitobia 
 Termitobia 
 Termitolinus 
 Termitonda
 Termitopaedia 
 Termitopulex 
 Termitotecna 
 Termitotropha 
 Termozyras

References

Aleocharinae
Polyphaga tribes